Konaklı (formerly Şarapsa and Telatiye) is a town in Alanya district of Antalya Province, Turkey.

Geography

Konaklı is a coastal town in Alanya district of Antalya Province. At  it is on Turkish state highway  which runs from west to east in south Turkey. The population of Konaklı was 13,563 as of 2012.

History

There are ruins of the Roman city Augae in the vicinity. The road constructed by the Seljuk sultan Alaattin Keykubat I connecting Alanya to Konya and the Şarapsa Han built by Seljuk sultan Gıyaseddin Keyhüsrev II (both in the 13th century) are in the vicinity.

In 1992, Konaklı was declared a seat of township.

Economy 

The town economy depends highly on tourism. There are over fifteen 5-star beach resorts in the town.

Greenhouse agriculture and banana plantations are other profitable sectors.

Healthcare 
Healthcare in the town is mainly provided by two organizations:

 Kemal Atlı Family Health Center (also called Kemal Atlı Aile Sağlığı Merkezi); a 9-to-5 state-owned minor-level primary care center which only serves the native population.
 Konaklı Medical Center (also called Özel Konaklı Polikliniği - Private Konaklı Polyclinic); a 24/7 private mid-level polyclinic and healthcare center led by Dr. Adnan Sarı M.D. wherein all physicians are multilingual as it predominantly serves the growing European population of the town.

References

Populated places in Antalya Province
Towns in Turkey
Alanya District
Populated coastal places in Turkey